Sisters and brothers are siblings.

Sisters and Brothers may also refer to:

"Sisters and Brothers", a song by German singer Sandra from The Long Play
Sisters & Brothers, a 2011 Canadian film

See also
 Sibling, an individual who has one or both parents in common
 Birth order
 The Sisters Brothers (novel) 2011 Western novel
 The Sisters Brothers (film), 2018 Western film
Brother and Sister (disambiguation)
Brothers and Sisters (disambiguation)